This is the discography for Creation Records. Apart from a few anomalies, the Creation catalogue runs in two concurrent series; one for albums and one for singles including EPs.

Albums may be in LP (CRELP) or compact disc (CRECD or sometimes CRELP  CD) format, with singles listed as CRE, CRE T or CRESCD, depending on format. A CRELP or CRECD with the same number refers to the same album, even though not all albums have releases in both formats, leading to apparent gaps in the series, as opposed to the actual gaps where numbers were set aside for albums but never used.

Discography

See also
List of record labels

References

External links
 Review of the entire collection of Creation Records' albums
Stylus Magazine list and review of Creation Records first 50 singles

Discography
Discographies of British record labels